Dihexyverine is an antimuscarinic pharmaceutical drug related to dicycloverine used as a spasmolytic.

References

Muscarinic antagonists
1-Piperidinyl compounds
Carboxylate esters
Muscle relaxants